El amor no es como lo pintan (Love is not as it looks) is a Mexican telenovela produced by Juan David Burns and Elisa Salinas for TV Azteca. It was broadcast on Azteca Trece from September 4, 2000 to May 4, 2001 for 175 episodes and the first Mexican version of the popular Colombian telenovela, Yo soy Betty, la fea.

Cast
 Vanessa Acosta .... Alicia "Licha" Ramírez Campos/Desiree Campos
 Héctor Soberón .... César Segovia / Felipe Sabatié
 Arturo Beristáin .... Gerardo Ramírez
 Rosenda Monteros .... María Elena Ramírez "Mamá Nena"
 Manuel Francisco Valdez .... Juanito Ramírez Campos
 José Loza .... Rolando Segovia
 Gina Romand .... Dunia Sabatié de Segovia, villain, but turns good
 Víctor González Reynoso .... Alberto Segovia, villain
 Sergio Klainer .... Manuel Segovia
 Aarón Beas .... Jorge Segovia
 Eva Prado .... Silvia Segovia
 Gina Moret .... Clotilda Campos/Clotilda Silva de Napoli
 Vanessa Villela .... Cynthia Rico
 Rodolfo Arias .... Pablo Rico
 Elizabeth Guindi .... Martha de Rico
 Kenya Mori .... Alma de Galán
 Andrés Palacios .... Jaime Galán Valdés
 Regina Torné .... Engracia Perez Ovando
 Miguel Couturier .... Enrique Alvarado
 Nubia Martí .... Carolina Alvarado
 Betty Monroe .... Marisela Aguilera, villain, turns good
 Carmen del Valle .... Sonia de Aguilera
 Nur .... Susana "Susy" Oviedo
 Rodrigo Cachero .... Javier Batres
 Bárbara Eibenshutz .... Cecilia Batres
 Rodrigo Mejía .... José González
 Roberto Medina .... Rafael Ávila
 Mercedes Olea .... Carmen
 Ana La Salvia .... Lena 
 Dunia Saldívar .... Nana Paquita
 René Campero .... Padre Adriano
 Germán Valdés III .... Mariano
 Joanydka Mariel .... Luciana
 Enoc Leaño .... Mario
 Guillermo Murray .... Jose Maria, villain
 Carlos East Jr. .... Andrés
 Pablo Azar .... Popo
 Susana Alexander .... Daniela
 Martha Itzel....Chayito

References

External links
 

2000 telenovelas
2000 Mexican television series debuts
2001 Mexican television series endings
Mexican telenovelas
TV Azteca telenovelas
Mexican television series based on Colombian television series
Spanish-language telenovelas